"Lost" is a song written by Mitch Allan and Kara DioGuardi and was recorded by American country music singer Faith Hill.  It was released in June 2007 as the first single from her compilation album The Hits.

The week after its release, it made the highest debut of the week at #61 on the US Hot 100 Singles Chart. Despite this, the song struggled on the country charts being unable to reach the top 30, in part because "I Need You", a top-10 duet with Tim McGraw from McGraw's Let It Go, was concurrently active on the charts. Even though without a music video, the song peaked at #32 on that chart. Released to AC radio, it has been a moderate hit reaching #11 and spending 21 weeks on chart. It also reached #40 on the 2008 Billboard Year End Hot Adult Contemporary Songs chart.

Chart performance

Weekly charts

Year-end charts

References

2007 singles
Songs written by Kara DioGuardi
2007 songs
Faith Hill songs
Songs written by Mitch Allan
Song recordings produced by Byron Gallimore
Warner Records singles